Kuperus may refer to:

Astronomy
 9692 Kuperus, an asteroid (named after Max Kuperus)

People

 Harmen Kuperus (b. 1977), Frisian-Dutch footballer
 Nicola Kuperus, American musician